Malcolm McEacharn Mitchell-Thomson, 3rd Baron Selsdon (born 27 October 1937), is a British peer, banker and businessman. He was one of the ninety hereditary peers elected to remain in the House of Lords after the passing of the House of Lords Act 1999, sitting as a Conservative. His membership was ended on 11 May 2021, due to non-attendance. At the time, in his 58th year of service, he was the second longest-serving member of the House of Lords after Lord Trefgarne.

The son of the 2nd Baron Selsdon, he was educated at Winchester College. Mitchell-Thomson served in the Royal Navy from 1956 to 1958, reaching the rank of sub-lieutenant in the Royal Naval Reserve.

Having succeeded to the barony after his father's death, he sat first in Parliament on 30 July 1963. He made his maiden speech in the Lords on 9 December 1970 in a debate entitled: Pollution and Protection of the Environment. His next speech was in a debate on the EEC: British entry negotiations, on 19 January 1971. In his third speech he seconded Lady Macleod of Borve's (she was the widow of Iain Macleod) Address in Reply to Her Majesty's Most Gracious Speech, on 2 November 1971, an honour given him on account of his having caught the eye of fellow Wykehamist and EEC enthusiast, the Leader of the House, Lord Jellicoe.

Lord Selsdon worked for the UAM Group from 1959 to 1963, for the London Press Exchange Group from 1964 to 1972 and for Singer & Friedlander from 1972 to 1976. Between 1976 and 1990, he was director international banking and public finance adviser of the Midland Bank Group. From 1978 to 1998, he worked with Merloni Group and from 1994 to 1998 for Raab Karcher. Since 1996, he has worked for MJ Gleeson Group Plc and since 2001, he has been president of the Anglo-Swiss Society. Between 1992 and 1998, Malcolm Mitchell-Thomson was president of the British Exporters' Association.

In 2004, he was Honorary Treasurer and Honorary Secretary of the House of Lords Yacht Club.

In 1965, he married firstly Patricia Anne Smith. Having been divorced he married secondly Gabrielle Williams in 1995. He has one son by his first wife.

References

1937 births
Barons in the Peerage of the United Kingdom
Conservative Party (UK) hereditary peers
English bankers
Living people
Mitchell
Royal Naval Reserve personnel
Hereditary peers elected under the House of Lords Act 1999